Bandera (Spanish: "flag") is the county seat of Bandera County, Texas, United States, in the Texas Hill Country, which is part of the Edwards Plateau. The population was 829 at the 2020 census.

Bandera calls itself the "Cowboy Capital of the World".

History
A visitor to Bandera can see a sign on Main Street in front of the fire department that states that Bandera was founded by Polish Roman Catholic immigrants from Upper Silesia. St. Stanislaus Catholic Church was built by those immigrants, and the church is one of the oldest in Texas. Many of the residents are descended from those original Polish immigrants.

Several stories exist regarding the origin of the name "Bandera". One says that in the 19th century, a flag was placed at the top of a path that came to be called Bandera Pass, due to bandera being the Spanish word for flag.

Bandera was on the Great Western Cattle Trail, during the second half of the 19th century.

Geography
Bandera is located in east-central Bandera County at  (29.7258, −99.0750).

Demographics

2020 census

As of the 2020 United States census, there were 829 people, 240 households, and 118 families residing in the city.

2000 census
As of the census of 2000, 957 people, 408 households, and 239 families were residing in the city. The 488 housing units averaged . The racial makeup of the city was 94.98% White, 0.21% African American, 0.52% Native American, 2.51% from other races, and 1.78% from two or more races. Hispanics  or Latinos of any race were 21.84% of the population.

Of the 408 households,  24.5% had children under 18 living with them, 43.4% were married couples living together, 11.3% had a female householder with no husband present, and 41.4% were not families. About 34.1% of all households were made up of individuals, and 16.2% had someone living alone who was 65 or older. The average household size was 2.22, and the average family size was 2.86.

In the city, the age distribution was 21.5% under 18, 6.7% from 18 to 24, 23.5% from 25 to 44, 23.2% from 45 to 64, and 25.1% who were 65  or older. The median age was 44 years. For every 100 females, there were 83.3 males. For every 100 females age 18 and over, there were 82.3 males.

Males had a median income of $27,604 versus $17,813 for females. The per capita income for the city was $16,502. About 11.0% of families and 15.3% of the population were below the poverty line, including 18.0% of those under age 18 and 17.1% of those age 65 or over.

Education
Bandera is served by the Bandera Independent School District and home to the Bandera High School Bulldogs.

Entertainment
Bandera is featured in the 1980 CBS unsold pilot Jake's Way, which starred Robert Fuller, Michael Jaymes, Andrew Duggan,  Slim Pickens, and newcomers Lisa LeMole, Stephen McNaughton (credited as Steven McNaughton), and Ben Lemon, and was produced by Disney Television Studios and Barry and Enright Productions.
 The city is home of Arkey Blue's Silver Dollar, a famous Hill Country honky-tonk, and was included in the 1975 horror film, Race with the Devil.
 On Sunday mornings, Bandera is a popular destination for motorcyclists from San Antonio, known as the Bandera Breakfast Run.
 Bandera is home to the Bandera Riverfest that takes place in June each year on the Medina River, offering tubing, kayaking, cookoffs, and live music throughout the weekend.
 Willie Nelson has an instrumental called "Bandera" on his Red Headed Stranger record.
 "[[Bandera Waltz}The Bandera Waltz]]" was written by Easy Adams in 1949, and has been recorded by the Texas Top Hands, Slim Whitman, and Bruce Robison.
 Bandera was once home to singer-songwriter Robert Earl Keen.
 Bandera is the hometown of singer-songwriter brothers Bruce and Charlie Robison.
 The rugged Hill Country State Natural Area is the location of the Bandera 100K trail run and the Cactus Rose 100-mile endurance run, two of the toughest ultramarathons in Texas. Both are hosted annually by race director and veteran trail runner Joe Prusaitis.
 The Bandera Downs horseracing facility lies just northeast of town. It is now closed.
 The Mayan Dude Ranch and the Dixie Dude Ranch, both over 50 years old, are located in Bandera.
  The Frontier Times Museum, founded by J. Marvin Hunter and named for Hunter's Frontier Times magazine, is located in Bandera.

Sister cities
 Strzelce Opolskie, Poland
 Tysmenytsia, Ukraine

Gallery

References

External links
 City of Bandera official website
 Bandera Chamber of Commerce
 Bandera Visitors Bureau
 
 

Cities in Bandera County, Texas
Cities in Texas
County seats in Texas
History of San Antonio
Latter Day Saint movement in Texas
Greater San Antonio